is a passenger railway station located in the city of Kuki, Saitama, Japan, operated by the private railway operator Tōbu Railway.

Lines
Washinomiya Station is served by the Tōbu Isesaki Line, and is located 52.1 km from the Tokyo terminus of them line at

Station layout
This station has an elevated station building, with one island platform and one side platform serving three tracks located on the ground level; however, the central track and one side of the island platform are no longer in use.

Platforms

Adjacent stations

History
Washinomiya Station opened on 6 September 1902.

From 17 March 2012, station numbering was introduced on all Tōbu lines, with Washinomiya Station becoming "TI-03".

Passenger statistics
In fiscal 2019, the station was used by an average of 6723 passengers daily (boarding passengers only).

Surrounding area
 Former Washinomiya Town Hall
Washinomiya Post Office
 Washinomiya Shrine
 Washinomiya High School

See also
 List of railway stations in Japan

References

External links

  Washinomiya Station information (Tobu) 

Tobu Isesaki Line
Stations of Tobu Railway
Railway stations in Saitama Prefecture
Railway stations in Japan opened in 1902
Kuki, Saitama